Luc Bondy (17 July 1948 – 28 November 2015) was a Swiss theatre and film director.

Life and career

Trained in Paris with the theatre teacher Jacques Lecoq, he received a job in 1969 as an assistant at the Hamburg Thalia Theatre. In a surprise, he took over in 1985 after the resignation of Peter Stein at the Schaubühne in Berlin. He also worked as a producer of both plays and operas at the Salzburg Festival, and in 1985 as a director at the Vienna Festival.

He was the director of the most recent version of Tosca, by Puccini, at the Metropolitan Opera in New York. Both the opera, as well as the director, were greeted by loud boos on opening night, 21 September 2009. The reception was generally negative. James Levine, the music director at the Metropolitan Opera likened the production to a 'Hitchcock movie' and the cultural critic for the New York Times, Charles McGrath, felt that the new production was a part of Gelb's mission to transform the Met by emphasizing theatricality.

In an interview after the premiere of Marc-André Dalbavie's opera Charlotte Salomon, Bondy was asked whether his being Jewish had anything to do with his having directed the production. "So I said to her this is a production about a Jewish artist...the subject is the story of Charlotte Salomon" said Bondy, who then walked out on the interviewer.

He died on 28 November 2015 in Zurich.

Direction
Source:

Stage productions
 1971 : Der Narr und die Nonne (The Fool and the Nun) by Stanisław Ignacy Witkiewicz at Göttingen
 1973 : Die See (The Sea) by Edward Bond at the Munich Residenztheater
 1974 : Glaube, Liebe, Hoffnung (Faith, Love, Hope) by Ödön von Horvath at Hamburg
 1977 : Man spielt nicht mit der Liebe by Alfred de Musset at the Schaubühne, Berlin
 1980 : Happy Days by Samuel Beckett at Cologne
 1980 : Yvonne, die Burgunderprinzessin (Yvonne, the Princess of Burgundy) by Witold Gombrowicz at Cologne
 1982 : Macbeth by William Shakespeare at Cologne
 1983 : Sommer (Summer)  by Edward Bond at Munich
 1984 : Das weite Land (The Far Country) by Arthur Schnitzler at the Théâtre des Amandiers in Nanterre
 1985 : Triumph der Liebe (The Triumph of Love) by Marivaux
 1989 : Le conte d'hiver by Shakespeare, at Nanterre-Amandier
 1989 : Die Zeit und das Zimmer (The Time and the Room) by Botho Strauß, at Berlin (premiere)
 1990 : The Winter's Tale by Shakespeare, at the Lehniner Palace
 1992 : Schlußchor by Botho Strauß at Berlin (premiere)
 1993 : John Gabriel Borkman by Henrik Ibsen at the Théâtre de l'Odéon, Paris
 1993 : Das Gleichgewicht (The Equilibrium) by Botho Strauß, at the Salzburg Festival (premiere)
 1994 : Die Stunde da wir nichts voneinander wußten by Peter Handke
 1999 : Waiting for Godot by Samuel Beckett, at the Vienna Festival
 2000 : Drei Mal Leben by Yasmina Reza, at the Burgtheater in Vienna (premiere)
 2002 : Anatol by Arthur Schnitzler, at the Burgtheater in Vienna
 2004 : Cruel & Tender by Martin Crimp, at Young Vic, London (premiere)
 2005 : Die eine und die andere by Botho Strauß, at Berlin
 2005 : Viol by Botho Strauß, after Titus Andronicus, at Odéon, Atelier Berthier, Paris
 2010 : Sweet Nothings by David Harrower from Arthur Schnitzler's Liebelei at Young Vic, London (premiere)

Opera productions
 1986: Così fan tutte by Mozart (conducted by Sylvain Cambreling), at Amandier, La Monnaie, Wiener Festwochen
 1989: L'incoronazione di Poppea by Monteverdi, revised Philippe Boesmans, at Amandier, La Monnaie
 1990/1: Don Giovanni by Mozart (conducted by Claudio Abbado, starring Ruggero Raimondi), at Wiener Festwochen
 1992: Salome by Richard Strauss (conducted by Christoph von Dohnányi, starring Catherine Malfitano and Anja Silja), at the Salzburg Festival, Royal Opera House
 1993: Reigen by Philippe Boesmans (libretto by Luc Bondy, after "La ronde" by Schnitzler) at La Monnaie
 1995: Le nozze di Figaro by Mozart (conducted by Nikolaus Harnoncourt), at the Salzburg Festival
 1996: Don Carlos by Giuseppe Verdi (conducted by Antonio Pappano, starring Roberto Alagna, José van Dam, Karita Mattila), at Châtelet, Royal Opera House, Opéra de Lyon, Edinburgh Festival
 1999: Wintermärchen by Philippe Boesmans (libretto by Luc Bondy, after The Winter's Tale by Shakespeare), at La Monnaie
 2000: Macbeth by Giuseppe Verdi (conducted Richard Armstrong), at Wiener Festwochen, Scottish Opera
 2001: The Turn of the Screw by Benjamin Britten (conducted by Daniel Harding), at Festival d'Aix-en-Provence (reprise 2005)
 2003: Hercules by Handel (conducted by William Christie with Les Arts Florissants) at Festival d'Aix-en-Provence, Opéra National de Paris, Wiener Festwochen, De Nederlandse Opera
 2005: Julie by Philippe Boesmans (libretto by Luc Bondy, after Miss Julie by Strindberg), at La Monnaie, Festival d'Aix-en-Provence
 2005: Idomeneo by Mozart (conducted by Daniel Harding), at Teatro alla Scala, Opéra National de Paris (2006)
 2009: Tosca by Puccini (conducted by James Levine), at the Metropolitan Opera, New York City (2009); seen later in Munich and Milan
 2009: libretto for Yvonne, princesse de Bourgogne
 2014: Charlotte Salomon (conducted by Marc-André Dalbavie), at the Salzburg Festival, 2014

Honors
 1984 Deutscher Kritikerpreis, Theater
 1990 Grand Prix Dominique de la mise en scène
 1992 Inszenierung des Jahres, Theater heute, for Schlusschor
 1997 Hans-Reinhart-Ring
 1998 Theaterpreis der Stiftung Preußische Seehandlung
 2000 Nestroy Theatre Prize 2000, Best Director, for Die Möwe The Seagull
 2001 Stanislawskij-Preis in Moskau for Die Möwe''
 2008 Zürcher Festspielpreis für La seconde surprise de l'amour
 2009 Preis der Kythera-Kulturstiftung Düsseldorf
 2013 Goldenes Ehrenzeichen für Verdienste um das Land Wien
 2014 Prix de l'Académie de Berlin

References

External links

 

1948 births
2015 deaths
Swiss opera directors
Swiss theatre directors
German-language film directors
Swiss film directors
Swiss Jews
Members of the Academy of Arts, Berlin
Film people from Zürich